French Creole may refer to:

Language
 French-based creole languages, creole languages based on the French language
 French Guianese Creole, a French-lexified creole language spoken mainly in French Guiana
 Antillean Creole French, a creole language with vocabulary based on French spoken primarily in the Lesser Antilles
 Haitian Creole, a creole language with vocabulary based on French spoken in Haiti
 Louisiana Creole, a French-based creole language spoken in Louisiana

People and cultures
 French Creoles a historic ethnic group of French ancestry born in the colonial western French territories outside France
 Creoles of color, a historic ethnic group of mixed racial ancestry born in the colonial western French territories outside France
 Louisiana Creole people, descendants of the colonial settlers of Louisiana, especially French and Spanish.
 A type of taco usually served in French Guiana

Other uses
 French ship Créole, six ships of the French navy

See also
 Creole (disambiguation)
 French

Language and nationality disambiguation pages